Chase Charmayne Sui Wonders (born May 21, 1996) is an American actress. She is best known for her roles as Riley in the HBO Max series Generation (2021) and Emma in the horror-comedy film Bodies Bodies Bodies (2022).

Early life 
Wonders was born in Detroit, Michigan. Her father is of Chinese ancestry and her mother is of European ancestry. They are both American in nationality. She is a niece of American fashion designer Anna Sui. She graduated from Harvard University magna cum laude, majoring in film studies and production, where she wrote for the college humor publication, The Harvard Lampoon.

Career 
Wonders started her film career as the protagonist, co-director, and lead screenwriter in the 2009 film A Trivial Exclusion. She also directed and wrote a feature-length film Last Migration in 2015. In 2019, she starred as Makayla in the psychological horror film Daniel Isn't Real. Wonders starred in a small role in 2020 comedy-drama film On the Rocks, directed by Sofia Coppola.

In 2021, Wonders joined the main cast of HBO Max's dramedy television series Generation as Riley, an independent and self-possessed mature high school student. In 2022, Wonders teamed up with Vogue China magazine to write and direct a short film titled Wake starring herself and Charles Melton.

On May 11, 2021, Wonders joined the cast of the satirical slasher film Bodies, Bodies, Bodies, directed by Halina Reijn. The film  premiered at the 2022 South by Southwest, on March 14, and began a wide release theater run in August. In October 2021, she was cast in Neil LaBute's Out of the Blue, alongside Diane Kruger and Hank Azaria. In January 2022, it was announced that she is set to star as Samantha, the lead character of Apple TV+'s City on Fire, series based on the book of the same name.

As a model, she appeared in a fashion collaboration campaign between her aunt, Anna Sui and Batsheva Hay in 2021.

Filmography

Film

Television

References

External links 
 

1996 births
Living people
American actors of Chinese descent
American models of Chinese descent
American directors
Harvard College alumni
Harvard Graduate School of Arts and Sciences alumni
The Harvard Lampoon alumni
American television actresses
Actresses from Detroit
Film directors from Michigan
Screenwriters from Michigan